The internal carotid plexus is situated on the lateral side of the internal carotid artery, and in the plexus there occasionally exists a small gangliform swelling, the carotid ganglion, on the under surface of the artery.

Postganglionic sympathetic fibres ascend from the superior cervical ganglion, along the walls of the internal carotid artery, to enter the internal carotid plexus. These fibres then distribute to deep structures, which include the Superior Tarsal Muscle and pupillary dilator muscles. Some of the fibres from the internal carotid plexus converge to form the deep petrosal nerve.

The internal carotid plexus communicates with the trigeminal ganglion, the abducent nerve, and the pterygopalatine ganglion (also named sphenopalatine); it distributes filaments to the wall of the internal carotid artery, and also communicates with the tympanic branch of the glossopharyngeal nerve.

Additional images

References

Notes

Nerve plexus